Baptria is a monotypic moth genus in the family Geometridae erected by Jacob Hübner in 1825. Its only species, Baptria tibiale, was first described by Eugenius Johann Christoph Esper in 1791. It is found in central and northern Europe.

The wingspan is 22–26 mm. The moth flies from June to July depending on the location.

The larvae feed on Actaea species, such as A. spicata and A. erythrocarpa.

Subspecies
The following subspecies are accepted:
 Baptria tibiale borealis Lankiala, 1937
 Baptria tibiale fennica Lankiala, 1937
 Baptria tibiale tibiale (Esper, 1791)

References

External links

 "08473 Baptria tibiale (Esper, 1791) - Schwarzer Christophskrautspanner, Trauerspanner". Lepiforum e.V..
 "Baptria Hübner, 1825". Kimmo's Lep Site.

Solitaneini
Moths described in 1791
Moths of Japan
Moths of Europe
Taxa named by Eugenius Johann Christoph Esper
Monotypic moth genera